Connection is a 2017 Indian film in Konkani, written and directed by Christ Sunjo Silva and produced by Sylvester Fernandes. This is Silva's third feature film, after Limits and Action. The film utilizes a non-linear storytelling technique and flashbacks and is a thriller. It features Prince Jacob in the lead role of Father Mark. The film also features Silva's father, tiatrist John D'Silva, in a role.

Plot 
Father Mark (Prince Jacob) is a kind priest who is very pious. He also loves books and is an author. One day, a prisoner approaches him to write a biography of his life. It is then revealed that Father Mark has a dark past which haunts him.

Cast
 Prince Jacob as Father Mark
 John D’Silva
 Benhur Silva
 Casiano Eddie D’Souza
 Chitra Afonso
 Benzer Fernandes
 Anirudh Kakule
 Sobita Kudtarkar
 Siddharth Nagoji
 Dencilla Dias

References

External links
 

2017 films
Films set in Goa
Films shot in Goa
2010s Konkani-language films